The Fellowship of Evangelical Bible Churches (FEBC) is a small evangelical Christian denomination with an Anabaptist Mennonite heritage.  Most of the denomination's approximately 5000 members are in congregations located in the U.S. and Canada.

Background
This body originated among Russian Mennonite immigrants that came to Canada and the United States from Russia around 1874. Their desire was to place greater evangelical emphasis on such doctrines as repentance, conversion, scriptural discipline and non-conformity to the world. Instrumental in the founding of the conference were Elder Isaac Peters of the Ebenezer Church in Henderson, Nebraska and Elder Aaron Wall, founder of the Brudertaler Church in Mountain Lake.

For many years member congregations used the name "Brudertaler," (or Bruderthaler) probably under the influence of the Mountain Lake founding church, and the conference itself was popularly called the Brudertaler (Bruderthaler) Conference.  In 1914 the name was officially changed to The Defenceless Mennonite Brethren in Christ of North America.  Then, in 1937 the name was formally changed to Evangelical Mennonite Brethren (EMB).

In 1956, the conference's headquarters were moved to Omaha, Nebraska from Mountain Lake, Minnesota.

The Evangelical Mennonite Brethren and the Evangelical Mennonite Church began talks of merger in 1953, but the effort ended without success in 1962. These South American brethren shared similar background, language, doctrine, and practice. Affiliation was accomplished in 1958, with the South American group being made a district of the general conference, but with self-government.
Until 1983, the conference officially held the Mennonite position of non-resistance and not bearing arms in war. Since that year, their constitution, while maintaining the official position, has also recognized the individual's right to their own conscience concerning these matters.

In the 1980s, a Canadian group which was originally known as the New Covenant Apostolic Order, separated from the EMB church, eventually becoming the Saskatchewan Diocese of the Evangelical Orthodox Church.

The Evangelical Mennonite Brethren Conference changed its name to the Fellowship of Evangelical Bible Churches on July 16, 1987. At that time the conference consisted of 36 congregations with a membership of 4583 (of which 1981 members in 20 congregations were in Canada and 423 members were in South America).

Beliefs
The Fellowship of Evangelical Bible Churches holds an orthodox Trinitarian theology, the infallible inspiration of the Scriptures, and is dispensational premillennial in eschatology. The body recognizes two ordinances — baptism and the Lord's supper. They practice water baptism of believers by immersion, but will recognize as valid other modes when administered by others, or when immersion is impossible due to a medical condition.  Open communion is observed with bread and fruit of the vine. The Fellowship of Evangelical Bible Churches exists to increase fellowship between member congregations, promote evangelism and missions, and represent the congregations through membership in boards and organizations outside the FEBC.

Membership
In 2003 the FEBC in North America had 3620 members (Canada - 2170; USA - 1450) in 36 congregations (Canada - 20; USA - 16), as well as 5 churches in Argentina and Paraguay. The Fellowship Focus is a bi-monthly magazine published by the FEBC. The conference headquarters are located in Omaha, Nebraska, having been moved there from Mountain Lake, Minnesota in 1956. They hold membership in the Evangelical Fellowship of Canada (org. 1964), the National Association of Evangelicals (USA, org. 1942) and the Mennonite World Conference.

In 2013, there were 44 congregations included on the FEBC rolls.  Most of the churches were in the U.S. and Canada, with one being in Paraguay.

Notes

References
Dyck, Cornelius J.An Introduction to Mennonite History. Herald Press, 1993. 
Encyclopedia of American Religions, J. Gordon Melton, editor
Enns-Rempel, Kevin. “A Merger That Never Was: The Conference of Evangelical Mennonites, 1953-1962,” Mennonite Life 48 (1993): 16-21.
Enns-Rempel, Kevin. “The Fellowship of Evangelical Bible Churches and the Quest for Religious Identity,” Mennonite Quarterly Review  63 (July 1989).
Handbook of Denominations in the United States, by Frank S. Mead, Samuel S. Hill, and Craig D. Atwood
Leaving Anabaptism: From Evangelical Mennonite Brethren to Fellowship of Evangelical Bible Churches, by Calvin Wall Redekop, .
Mennonite Encyclopedia, Cornelius J. Dyck, Dennis D. Martin, et al., editors

External links
 Official website
 Historical sketch 1889–1953 of Evangelical Mennonite Brethren church
 Fellowship of Evangelical Bible Churches in Global Anabaptist Mennonite Encyclopedia Online

 
Evangelical denominations in North America
Mennonite denominations
Mennonitism in the United States
Anabaptist denominations in North America
Christian denominations established in the 19th century
Religious organizations established in 1889